Behlmer is a surname. Notable people with the surname include:

Anna Behlmer, American film and television re-recording mixer
Rudy Behlmer (1926–2019), American film historian and writer

See also
Behmer